William T. Boylan Gymnasium is a 2,500-seat multi-purpose arena in West Long Branch, New Jersey. It was built in 1965 and was home to the Monmouth University Hawks basketball team. The Northeast Conference men's basketball tournament was held there in 1996 and 2004.

The basketball teams moved into the Multipurpose Activity Center at the start of the 2009–2010 season.

References

College basketball venues in the United States
Indoor arenas in New Jersey
Sports venues in New Jersey
Basketball venues in New Jersey
Monmouth Hawks basketball
West Long Branch, New Jersey
1965 establishments in New Jersey
Sports venues completed in 1965